Dunston Checks In is a 1996 Canadian-American children's comedy film directed by Ken Kwapis. The film stars Eric Lloyd, Graham Sack, Jason Alexander, Faye Dunaway, Rupert Everett, Paul Reubens, Glenn Shadix, and Sam the Orangutan as Dunston. The film received negative reviews and was a box office bomb, only grossing $10 million against a budget of $16 million.

Plot
Lionel Spalding (Glenn Shadix) and his dog Neil arrive at the prestigious, five-star Majestic Hotel where, due to a prank by Kyle Grant (Eric Lloyd) and his older brother Brian (Graham Sack), an overflowing fountain accidentally drenches him, greatly frustrating the hotel manager and the boys' widowed father Robert (Jason Alexander). He is disappointed with the boys but they are guaranteed a vacation in Barbados afterward, only for the ruthless, haughty hotel owner, Elena Dubrow (Faye Dunaway), to force them to cancel the trip for a third time, due to the upcoming Crystal Ball where one of the guests is revealed to be a critic from the Le Monde Traveller Organization who they hope will reward the Majestic with a sixth star.

At that moment, "Lord" Rutledge (Rupert Everett), a jewel thief whom Mrs. Dubrow believes is the critic, arrives with an orangutan named Dunston, intending to steal the guests' jewelry. Dunston and his deceased brother Samson were both trained in thievery their entire lives, and Dunston has been wanting to escape from Rutledge's poor treatment and life of crime ever since.

Meanwhile, Rutledge distracts and causes Kyle to accidentally set a sterling rope mini-pulley free from his hand where Brian falls down and out from a laundry chute. Dunston flees from Rutledge and is later found by Kyle, who befriends the poor orangutan and promises to keep him safe. However, Dunston soon begins causing disruption in the hotel such as ruining Spalding's workout and interfering with Mrs. Angela Dellacroce's massage. After realizing Dunston's presence, Robert calls for an animal control specialist named Buck LaFarge (Paul Reubens) to remove Dunston from the hotel.

Rutledge searches the hotel for Dunston, and after locating him, ties Kyle up and gags him. Dunston and Kyle escape to the ballroom where the Crystal Ball is taking place, obtaining a picture of Rutledge, Dunston, and Samson from Rutledge's room. Kyle and Brian show the picture to their dad, and Robert is infuriated when Kyle says Rutledge tied him up. Brian and Kyle search for Dunston, avoiding LaFarge and Mrs. Dubrow, while Robert and Rutledge fight in the kitchen. Mrs. Dubrow eventually corners Kyle, but Dunston hanging from a chandelier pushes her into the giant party cake. Robert eventually stands up to Mrs. Dubrow, but is fired in the process. However, it turns out that Spalding, who had been humiliated, injured, and inconvenienced by Dunston's antics, was the critic all along. As a result, Spalding declares Mrs. Dubrow managed to go from a five-star hotel to a one-star hotel before passing out from LaFarge's tranquilizer dart. Rutledge is arrested and LaFarge apologizes to Dunston, who then slaps him.

In the end, thanks to the more kind-hearted Mr. Victor Dubrow (Nathan Davis), Robert, Kyle, and Brian relocate to Bali to manage a Majestic Hotel there and have even managed to keep Dunston as a pet. They invite Spalding over with a complimentary room and meals to make up for all the trouble he experienced and assure him that nothing will go wrong this time. However, in the last scene, Dunston causes further trouble by dropping a large coconut which lands on Spalding's head.

Cast
 Sam the Orangutan as Dunston
 Bob Bergen as Dunston (voice)
Jason Alexander as Robert Grant
Eric Lloyd as Kyle Grant
 Graham Sack as Brian Grant
Faye Dunaway as Elena Dubrow
Rupert Everett as Lord Rutledge
 Paul Reubens as Buck LaFarge 
 Glenn Shadix as Lionel Spalding 
 Nathan Davis as Victor Dubrow 
 Jennifer Bassey as Angela Dellacroce 
 Steven Gilborn as Artie
 Frank Welker as Neil (voice)
Bree Turner as French girl

Reception
The film received mostly negative reviews from critics, and holds a 16% rating on Rotten Tomatoes based on 19 reviews.

Some contemporary reviews were more generous, however. Desson Howe and Rita Kempley of The Washington Post referred to the film by saying "it ain't half bad", and a "plucky, prank-filled family farce" respectively. Kevin Thomas of the Los Angeles Times stated that Dunston Checks In "is a delightful and funny family film of exceptional high style", "as light as a soufflé and just as delicious", and "plays like a tribute to the resourceful, unpretentious studio productions of the past". According to an article published in the Chicago Tribune, "The cast is talented, the hide-and-seek action is silly (not killing), and the bond between a sweet little boy and the adorable ape is touching."

Audiences surveyed by CinemaScore gave the film a grade of "A" on a scale of A+ to F.

Faye Dunaway's performance in the film and in The Chamber earned her a Golden Raspberry Award nomination for Worst Supporting Actress. The film was also nominated at the 18th Youth in Film Awards (Young Artist Awards) for Best Family Feature Film: Musical or Comedy, and Eric Lloyd for Best Performance in a Feature Film - Actor Age Ten or Under. The film was successful at the box office in India, where it was dubbed in Hindi and retitled Ek Bandar Hotel Ke Andar.

Home media
Dunston Checks In was much more successful in home video than in theaters.  the studio had an estimated $41.6 million in video sales, receiving 75%, greatly exceeding box office gross. The film was released by 20th Century Fox Home Entertainment on VHS on May 27, 1996. It was released on DVD on May 28, 2002, and re-released on March 18, 2014.

References

External links
 
 
 

1996 films
1996 comedy films
1990s buddy comedy films
1990s children's comedy films
20th Century Fox films
American buddy comedy films
American children's comedy films
American slapstick comedy films
Canadian children's comedy films
English-language Canadian films
Films about apes
Films directed by Ken Kwapis
Films scored by Miles Goodman
Films set in 1995
Films set in hotels
Films set in New York City
1990s English-language films
1990s American films
1990s Canadian films